{{Infobox military conflict
| conflict          = Chittagong Hill Tracts conflict
| image             = Guerrilla Leader Santu Larmars Hide-out- Duduk Chora- Khagrachiri- May 5- 1994- Biplob Rahman.jpg
| image_size        = 300px
| caption           = Shanti Bahini insurgents, photographed on 5 May 1994.
| date              =  – 2 December 1997 (20 years)
| place             = Chittagong Hill Tracts, Bangladesh
| result            = Chittagong Hill Tracts Peace Accord
| combatant1        = 
| combatant2        = 
Supported by:
| commander1        = 
| commander2        = 
| units1            =  
  24th Infantry Division

Paramilitary Forces:Law Enforcement:| units2            = 
| strength1         = 
 Army: 33,000-80,000
 Border Guard Bangladesh : 25,000
 Bangladesh Ansar: 5,000
 Armed Police: 10,000
| strength2         = 
| casualties1       = 
| casualties2       = 
| casualties3       = 3,500–25,000 civilians(Bengali settlers and indigenous villagers)
}}

The Chittagong Hill Tracts conflict''' was a political and armed conflict between the government of Bangladesh and the Parbatya Chattagram Jana Samhati Samiti (United People's Party of the Chittagong Hill Tracts) and its armed wing, the Shanti Bahini, over the issue of autonomy and the land rights of Jumma people, mainly for Chakma people and the other indigenous of Chittagong Hill Tracts. Shanti Bahini launched an insurgency against government forces in 1977, when the country was under military rule, and the conflict continued for twenty years until the government and the PCJSS signed the Chittagong Hill Tracts Peace Accord in 1997.

The actions then carried out by the Armed Forces and the Parbatya Chattagram Jana Sanghati Samiti groups resulted in casualties on both sides. There were also reports of mass rapes by the paramilitary Bangladesh Ansars, though these have been disputed. According to Amnesty International as of June 2013 the Bangladeshi government made "praiseworthy progress" in implementing the terms of the peace accord and in addressing the Jumma people's concerns over the return of their land. Amnesty estimate that there are currently only 900 internally displaced Jumma families.

Background
The origin of the conflict in the Chittagong Hill Tracts dates back to the British rule. The British, at the end of the 19th century, reorganized the CHT. This resulted in the recognition of three tribal chiefs (rajas) in 1860, (b) enactment of the Chittagong Hill Tracts Frontier Police Regulations in 1881, authorizing a police force from among the hill peoples, and (c) enactment of the Chittagong Hill Tracts Regulations in 1900, giving them rights and autonomy.

When Bangladesh was the eastern wing of Pakistan, widespread resentment occurred over the displacement of as many as 100,000 of the native peoples due to the construction of the Kaptai Dam in 1962. The displaced did not receive compensation from the government and many thousands fled to India.

After the creation of Bangladesh in 1971, representatives of the Chittagong Hill Tracts who was the Chakma politician Manabendra Narayan Larma sought autonomy and recognition of the rights of the peoples of the region. Larma and other Hill Tracts representatives protested the draft of the Constitution of Bangladesh. It did not recognise the ethnic identity and culture of the non-Bengali peoples of Bangladesh. The government policy recognised only the Bengali culture and the Bengali language, and designated all citizens of Bangladesh as Bengalis. In talks with a Chittagong Hill Tracts delegation led by Manabendra Narayan Larma, the country's founding leader Sheikh Mujibur Rahman expressed that the ethnic groups of the Hill Tracts as citizen of Bangladesh should have the Bengali identity which later was proven to be a false allegation.

The migrated hill Jummas were given with special treatment, as they were the minority after independence in 1971. The rebellion by the Jumma began after the 1971 independence of Bangladesh.

Insurgency
M. N. Larma and others founded the Parbatya Chattagram Jana Samhati Samiti (PCJSS) as a united political organisation of all native peoples and tribes in 1973. The armed wing of the PCJSS, the Shanti Bahini was organised to resist government policies. The crisis aggravated during the emergency rule of Sheikh Mujib, who had banned all political parties other than his BAKSAL and the successive military regimes that followed after his assassination in 1975. In 1977, the Shanti Bahini launched their first attack on a Bangladesh Army convoy. It is alleged that the Indian government helped the Shanti Bahini set up bases across the border from Bangladesh.

The Shanti Bahini divided its area of operations into zones and raised forces from the native people, who were formally trained. The Shanti Bahini led attacks on Bengali Police and Soldiers, government offices, personnel and the other Bengalis in the region. The group also attacked any native believed to be opposing it and supporting the government. According to government sources between 1980 and 1991, 1,180 people were killed by the Shanti Bahini, and 582 were kidnapped.

400 Chakmas including Anupam Chakma absconded to India to evade the Bangladesh Army in 1989. Though it was claimed to represent all tribes of Chittagong Hill Tracts, but in reality Chakmas dominated the Shanti Bahini.

G. M. Mushfiqur Rahman, a lieutenant in the Bangladesh Army posted in 1 Field Artillery Regiment of Bangladesh Army in Chittagong Hill Tracts. On September 8, 1989, he led a 17-member team of Bangladesh Army soldiers and attacked a terrorist Shanti Bahini camp. Lieutenant Rahman was injured during the clash and died on that day at 8:15 am. He was posthumously awarded with the Bir Uttom award.

On 11 September 1996 the Chakma Shanti Bahini rebels reportedly abducted and killed 28 to 30 Bengali woodcutters.

Detention

Peoples living in the Hill Tracts area were often detained and tortured in the custody on suspicion of being members of the Shanti Bahini or helping them. There were numerous check posts on highways and ferries in Chittagong Hill Tracts.

People who are detained on suspicion are subjected to severe beating, electrocution, water boarding, hanging upside down, shoving burning cigarettes on bodies etc. Prisoners are detained in pits and trenches. The captives are then taken out for interrogation once at a time.

Recent developments

2018 Ambush

21 years after the peace treaty on 5 May 2018 unidentified gunmen ambushed and assassinated 5 people in Rangamati district, including UPDF leader Tapan Jyoti Chakma. It is suspected the attack was caused by internal conflicts between rival Chackma factions. This is the deadliest such incident involving the indigenous tribal Chackma people since the signing of the Chittagong Hill Tracts Peace Accord in 1997.

2022 travel ban
Amidst intelligence reports of insurgency buildup in the region, on October 20, 2022 Bangladesh authorities issue travel ban in Bandarban district amidst security concerns in the region.

An ethnic insurgency group, the Kuki Chin National Front, has gained a foothold in the region. RAB has launched an antiinsurgency campaign, that led to 250 refugees fleeing over the border into Mizoram (India),Allegedly 2000 more civilians are hiding in the wilderness. RAB told the media that 10 militants belonging to the Kuki Chin Nation Front had been arrested in the operatin in the CHT.  Ten guns, 50 rounds of bullets, 62 cases, six bombs, two cartridge belts, and a locally made pistol along with other equipment and jihadi literature were also seized during the Operation 
Even more Info:1 militant killed.

Government reaction

At the outbreak of the insurgency, the Government of Bangladesh deployed the army to begin counter-insurgency operations. The then-President of Bangladesh Ziaur Rahman created a Chittagong Hill Tracts Development Board under an army general to address the socio-economic needs of the region, but the entity proved unpopular and became a source of antagonism and mistrust amongst the native people against the government. The government failed to address the long-standing issue of the displacement of people, numbering an estimated 100,000 caused by the construction of the Kaptai Dam in 1962. Displaced people did not receive compensation and more than 40,000 Chakma people had fled to India. In the 1980s, the government began settling Bengalis in the region, causing the eviction of many natives and a significant alteration of demographics. Having constituted only 11.6% of the regional population in 1974, the number of Bengalis grew by 1991 to constitute 48.5% of the regional population.

In 1989, the government of then-president Hossain Mohammad Ershad passed the District Council Act created three tiers of local government councils to devolve powers and responsibilities to the representatives of the native peoples, but the councils were rejected and opposed by the PCJSS.

Peace accord

Peace negotiations were initiated after the restoration of democracy in Bangladesh in 1991, but little progress was made with the government of Prime Minister Begum Khaleda Zia, the widow of Ziaur Rahman and her Bangladesh Nationalist Party. Fresh rounds of talks began in 1996 with the newly elected prime minister Sheikh Hasina Wajed of the Awami League, the daughter of Sheikh Mujibur Rahman. The peace accord was finalised and formally signed on 2 December 1997.

The agreement recognised the special status of the hill residents. Chakma rebels were still in the Chittagong Hill Tracts as of 2002.

Chakmas also live in India's Tripura State where a Tripuri separatist insurgency lasted between 1990 and 2012.

See also
 Chittagong Hill Tracts manual
 The Troubles, a similar armed event in Northern Ireland, Great Britain
 War in the Vendée, a similar armed event in Europe
 Boxer Rebellion, a similar armed event in Qing dynasty following the before the fall of the Manchu-led Imperial Qing dynasty
 Chinese Martyrs
 Persecution of Hindus in Bangladesh 
 1984 Anti-Sikh riots
 Cambodian Genocide
 Persecution of Buddhists in Bangladesh
 Persecution of Ahmadis in Bangladesh
 Persecution of Christians in Bangladesh
 Kosheh massacres
 Persecution of atheists and secularists in Bangladesh
 Freedom of religion in Bangladesh
 Human rights in Bangladesh

References

External links
 Full text of Chittagong Hill Tracts Peace Accord
 Genocide in Chittagong Hill Tracts

 
History of Chittagong Division
Internal conflict in Bangladesh
Internal migration
Insurgencies in Asia
1970s in Bangladesh
1980s in Bangladesh
1990s in Bangladesh
1970s conflicts
1980s conflicts
1990s conflicts
Persecution of Buddhists
Anti-Buddhism
Persecution of Hindus
Buddhism in Bangladesh
Hinduism in Bangladesh
Politics of Bangladesh
Chittagong Hills Tracts
Chittagong Hills Tracts
Chittagong Hills Tracts
Proxy wars
Religiously motivated violence in Bangladesh
Bangladesh–India relations
Persecution of Buddhists by Muslims
Genocides in Asia